Abatino Park is a rescue center for animals located in Poggio San Lorenzo, Italy, in an area of particular interest for the landscape and archaeological aspects.
The park was designed to allow the maintenance of indigenous specimens and exotic fauna.

References 

Parks in Lazio